Charles Richard Walton  (July 7, 1941 in Shattuck, Oklahoma – October 6, 1998) was an American football guard who played eight seasons in the National Football League for the Detroit Lions. Previously he played for the Montreal Alouettes and the Hamilton Tiger-Cats of the Canadian Football League. Walton played college football at Iowa State University.
Walton is present in the 1968 movie Paper Lion (film) for a couple of scenes, but did not have any speaking parts.

1941 births
1998 deaths
American football offensive linemen
American players of Canadian football
Canadian football offensive linemen
Detroit Lions players
Hamilton Tiger-Cats players
Iowa State Cyclones football players
Montreal Alouettes players
People from Shattuck, Oklahoma
Players of American football from Oklahoma